Steinkjer FK is a Norwegian football club from the town of Steinkjer, currently playing in the 3. divisjon, the fourth tier in the Norwegian league system, after being relegated from 2. divisjon in 2011. The club was founded in 1910. Steinkjer played in the top league in 1937–38, 1938–39, 1956–57, 1957–58, 1961–62, 1963, 1965, 1966, 1967 and 1978.
Their strongest performance in the league was in the 1961–62 season when they finished second, only beaten by Brann.

Home ground

Their home ground is Guldbergaunet Stadion. The record attendance through all times is 13,997 against Lyn in the Norwegian cup semi final 1970. This is an artificial pitch, which was ready in May 2003.

Notable former managers
 Bill Foulkes
 Tony Dunne

In 1982, Bill Foulkes (ex-Manchester United) was succeeded as manager of Steinkjer FK by his former United team-mate Tony Dunne. Tony Dunne had previously been an assistant manager for Bolton Wanderers, and had made numerous appearances for the Republic of Ireland national football team, captaining the side on four occasions.

Recent history 
{|class="wikitable"
|-bgcolor="#efefef"
! Season
! 
! Pos.
! Pl.
! W
! D
! L
! GS
! GA
! P
!Cup
!Notes
|-
|2006
|2. divisjon
|align=right |9
|align=right|26||align=right|11||align=right|3||align=right|12
|align=right|56||align=right|59||align=right|36
|Second round
|
|-
|2007
|2. divisjon
|align=right |11
|align=right|26||align=right|9||align=right|3||align=right|14
|align=right|49||align=right|75||align=right|30
|Second round
|
|-
|2008
|2. divisjon
|align=right |11
|align=right|26||align=right|10||align=right|1||align=right|15
|align=right|56||align=right|68||align=right|31
||Second round
|
|-
|2009
|2. divisjon
|align=right |12
|align=right|26||align=right|8||align=right|5||align=right|13
|align=right|47||align=right|70||align=right|29
||Second round
|
|-
|2010
|2. divisjon
|align=right |9
|align=right|26||align=right|9||align=right|4||align=right|13
|align=right|40||align=right|56||align=right|31
||Second round
|
|-
|2011 
|2. divisjon
|align=right bgcolor="#FFCCCC"| 14
|align=right|26||align=right|3||align=right|2||align=right|21
|align=right|43||align=right|106||align=right|11
||First round
|Relegated to the 3. divisjon
|-
|2012 
|3. divisjon
|align=right |5
|align=right|26||align=right|12||align=right|6||align=right|8
|align=right|56||align=right|44||align=right|42
||Second qualifying round
|
|-
|2013
|3. divisjon
|align=right |7
|align=right|26||align=right|11||align=right|4||align=right|11
|align=right|70||align=right|66||align=right|37
||First round
|
|-
|2014 
|3. divisjon
|align=right |4
|align=right|26||align=right|14||align=right|5||align=right|7
|align=right|72||align=right|40||align=right|47
||First round
|
|-
|2015 
|3. divisjon
|align=right |3
|align=right|26||align=right|19||align=right|1||align=right|6
|align=right|108||align=right|35||align=right|58
||Second qualifying round
|
|-
|2016 
|3. divisjon
|align=right |3
|align=right|26||align=right|17||align=right|2||align=right|7
|align=right|99||align=right|46||align=right|53
||Second qualifying round
|
|-
|2017 
|3. divisjon
|align=right |3
|align=right|26||align=right|12||align=right|4||align=right|10
|align=right|65||align=right|61||align=right|40
||First round
|
|-
|2018 
|3. divisjon
|align=right |8
|align=right|26||align=right|10||align=right|4||align=right|12
|align=right|48||align=right|46||align=right|34
||Second round
|
|-
|2019
|3. divisjon
|align=right bgcolor="#FFCCCC"| 14
|align=right|26||align=right|2||align=right|5||align=right|19
|align=right|20||align=right|73||align=right|11
||First round
|Relegated to the 4. divisjon
|}

References

External links
 Official homepage
 Guldbergaunet Stadion - Nordic Stadiums

 
Football clubs in Norway
Sport in Trøndelag
Eliteserien clubs
Steinkjer
1910 establishments in Norway
Association football clubs established in 1910